Hovea speciosa  is a flowering plant in the family Fabaceae, endemic to eastern Australia. It has purple pea flowers, linear leaves with long, rusty hairs on the lower surface. It is endemic to New South Wales.

Description
The upper surface a dull green, smooth except for a few hairs on the midrib, lower surface densely covered in cream, gold or brownish, short or spreading hairs.

Taxonomy and naming
Hovea speciosa was first formally described in 2001 by I.R. Thompson and the description was published in Australian Systematic Botany. The specific epithet (speciosa) means "showy".

Distribution and habitat
This hovea grows usually on sandstone in forests from Cowan, south to Nerriga, and the Blue Mountains.

References

speciosa
Flora of New South Wales
Fabales of Australia